Amaxia is a genus of moths in the family Erebidae erected by Francis Walker in 1855. The type species of the genus is Amaxia pardalis Walker, 1855.

Species

 Amaxia apyga Hampson, 1901
 Amaxia beata Dognin, 1909
 Amaxia bella Schaus, 1905
 Amaxia carinosa Schaus, 1920
 Amaxia chaon Druce, 1883
 Amaxia collaris E. D. Jones, 1912
 Amaxia consistens Schaus, 1905
 Amaxia corata Schaus, 1921
 Amaxia disconsistens Dognin, 1923
 Amaxia duchatae Toulgoët, 1987
 Amaxia egaensis Seitz, 1921
 Amaxia elongata Toulgoët, 1987
 Amaxia erythrophleps Hampson, 1901
 Amaxia fallaciosa Toulgoët, 1989
 Amaxia fallax Toulgoët, 1998
 Amaxia flavicollis Rothschild, 1909
 Amaxia flavipuncta Hampson, 1904
 Amaxia gnosia Schaus, 1905
 Amaxia hebe Schaus, 1892
 Amaxia inopinata Toulgoët, 1989
 Amaxia juvenis Schaus, 1896
 Amaxia kennedyi Rothschild, 1909
 Amaxia klagesi Rothschild, 1909
 Amaxia laurentia Schaus, 1905
 Amaxia lepida Schaus, 1912
 Amaxia manora Druce, 1906
 Amaxia ockendeni Rothschild, 1909
 Amaxia ornata Toulgoët, 1989
 Amaxia pandama Druce, 1893
 Amaxia pardalis Walker, 1855
 Amaxia perapyga Rothschild, 1922
 Amaxia peruana Rothschild, 1916
 Amaxia pseudamaxia Rothschild, 1917
 Amaxia pseudodyuna Rothschild, 1922
 Amaxia pulchra Rothschild, 1909
 Amaxia punctata Rothschild, 1909
 Amaxia pyga Schaus, 1892
 Amaxia reticulata Rothschild, 1909
 Amaxia theon Druce, 1900
 Amaxia tierna Schaus, 1920
 Amaxia violacea Reich, 1933

References

External links

 
Phaegopterina
Moth genera